Sectoria is a small genus of stone loaches native to eastern Asia.

Species
There are currently two recognized species in this genus:
 Sectoria atriceps (H. M. Smith, 1945)
 Sectoria heterognathos (Y. F. Chen, 1999)

References

Nemacheilidae
Fish of Asia